Rathfranpark Wedge Tomb is a wedge-shaped gallery grave and National Monument located in County Mayo, Ireland.

Location

History

This wedge tomb was built c. 2500–2000 BC, in the Copper or Bronze Age.

A stone circle once stood close to the tomb until the 1950s, when the stones were uprooted and dumped onto the wedge tomb.

Description

The gallery axis is ENE-WSW, so the ENE end points towards the rising sun at the summer solstice.

References

National Monuments in County Mayo
Archaeological sites in County Mayo
Tombs in the Republic of Ireland